Kilinailai Trench is an oceanic trench delineating the oceanic boundary between the Pacific Plate and North Bismarck Plates, in Papua New Guinea.  The Manus Trench, which looks as if it is a western continuation of the Kilinailai Trench, marks the boundary between the Caroline Plate and North Bismarck Plates. It is, however, disputed whether the Caroline Plate moves independently from the Pacific Plate.  If not, the Manus and Kilinailau trenches form the Pacific-North Bismarck boundary together.

References
 Notes

 Sources
 

Tectonic plates
Geology of the Pacific Ocean